is a 2005 PC visual novel video game developed by Type-Moon, and the sequel to Fate/stay night. The word "ataraxia" in the title is a Greek term for "tranquility", giving the title the combined meaning of "empty (or false) tranquility".

The game also was ported to PlayStation Vita, adding full-voice acting, among other enhancements. This version was released in Japan on November 27, 2014.

Plot

The plot of Fate/hollow ataraxia is set about 8 months after the events of Fate/stay night. Like its predecessor, the story is set in Fuyuki City. Bazett Fraga McRemitz, a member of the Mages' Association and a master in the Fifth Holy Grail War, wakes on the fourth day of the Fifth Holy Grail war with a new servant, Avenger, and no memory of what happened to her beforehand. She and Avenger set off to fight and win the Holy Grail War.

Meanwhile, Shirou Emiya lives a peaceful life with all of his friends from the Fifth Holy Grail War. After one of her experiments changes time and space, Rin Tohsaka leaves for the Mages' Association in England to fix things. The Servants sense a new danger while dark creatures appear soon afterward. Shirou, as a precaution, sets off to ensure nobody is in danger and instead finds himself frequently meeting a mysterious girl, Caren Ortensia.

Both Bazett and Shirou find themselves in a time loop that lasts four days, beginning on the fourth day of the Fifth Holy Grail War. Each time they die or survive four days, they always awake on the first day of the loop, aware of what has happened to them since the first time loop began. Determined to end the loop, Bazett, Avenger, and Shirou fight to discover the truth behind what is causing the endless four days.

Characters

Voiced by: Hitomi Nabatame (Fate/tiger colosseum, Fate/unlimited codes, Carnival Phantasm, Fate/kaleid liner Prisma Illya (anime), and Fate/hollow ataraxia (PSVita))
The first of the three protagonists. A mage from the Knights of the Red Branch sent by the Mage's Association to fight the Fifth Holy Grail War, born in Ireland as a descendant of old mage family. She originally summoned Lancer (her childhood hero), but was betrayed by her old colleague Kotomine and had her left arm with its Command Seals stolen. She was left for dead before she was discovered by Avenger, who created the time loop inside of Bazett's mind, so that she could stay alive from her fatal injuries. Bazett can directly fight and defeat Servants due to her family's combat-based magecraft and her ancestral Noble Phantasm: the sacred dagger Fragarach, which reverses time so that it always strikes first in response to her opponent's ultimate attack. She is mentioned very briefly in Fate/stay night but does not make an appearance.

Voiced by Ami Koshimizu (Fate/tiger colosseum, the All Around Type-Moon Drama CD, Carnival Phantasm, Fate/kaleid liner Prisma Illya (anime) and Fate/hollow ataraxia (PSVita))
A new and central character to the story, Caren is a member of the Church and works as a priestess. She is kind and forgiving to the point that she believes her only purpose in life is to help others, even if she is hurt in the process. She never blames the person who has hurt her and blames the act on demons who caused the person to commit the sin. Whenever she is at fault, she apologizes to God rather than the person. Despite her kindness, she has a love for teasing and exploiting others' emotional vulnerability. Upon discovery of an individual's weak spot, she enjoys bringing it out to light in front of all to witness. While this antagonizes many characters and causes much outrage and humiliation, she herself remains calm. Also, in spite of being a priestess, she has deliberately chosen to wear a revealing costume with no skirt to both increase her mobility and to seduce men.

As a member of the Church, Caren assists in exorcisms. Her body itself possesses an unusual property: if there is a person nearby who has been possessed by a demon, she will experience the same pain as the possessed person. As a result, exorcists employ her to act as a radar of sorts to find demons. This ability is most evident whenever she comes in proximity to the Servant Avenger as her body sprouts grotesque spikes. As a result of this power, she is always covered in bandages. She also experiences physical pain whenever people in proximity do evil things. In battle, she uses a red cloth of Magdala, which has the power to forcefully bind men. However, while the man is bound, no harmful physical attacks can be made against him or Magdala will be rendered useless. She is actually the daughter of Kotomine Kirei and hates him for abandoning her. In the epilogue, she has some interest in Shirou due to her close interactions with Avenger in the time loop, even painting him with oil to resemble the latter. She also wields control over Lancer, much to Bazett's dismay, as compensation for having saved Bazett, and refuses to return the Command Seals to Bazett unless she can have Bazett's current artificial hand, which the both of them have come to see as a sentimental reminder of Avenger.

Voiced by (Takuma Terashima in Fate/tiger colosseum, Fate/hollow ataraxia (PSVita), and Fate/Grand Order)
The 8th Servant, who was summoned in the 3rd war in lieu of a Berserker and another of the main protagonists. Avenger was originally a normal boy in the ancient middle east who, in a cruel twist of fate, was labeled as Angra Mainyu via a random lottery and was tortured until he died of old age so that he, as the embodiment of evil itself, could allow the other villagers to live free of sin and as a result became the first "Anti-Hero" to enter the Throne of Heroes, as well as becoming the model from which all martyrs within the Throne of Heroes stem from. He was later summoned as Avenger in the Third Grail War by the Einzbern in an attempt to cheat, but was the first to die (as he is not the actual Angra Mainyu, who had long since left for the Other Side of the World) and corrupted the Grail, as the belief of others had made him into All The World's Evils even though the Grail recognized him as a human with a wish it needed to fulfill (his own rebirth as Angra Mainyu), his presence within the Grail is what allows for the summoning of some of history and mythology's greatest villains and monsters as "heroes". He was released when Emiya Shirou and Saber utterly annihilated the Grail at the end of the Fifth Grail War and came across a dying Bazett and responded to her wish to live, by creating the time loop inside of Bazett's mind and created replicas of characters this dream world, but as he did not personally experience the Fifth Grail War, he instead recreated it using the Fifth's replica participants and with the Third Grail War's development as the base. He then took part in the loop using Emiya Shirou's body as a shell, allowing him to experience the peaceful daily life that Shirou experiences. He wields a pair of misshapen and brittle daggers in combat and his Noble Phantasm is "Verg Avesta" which reflects the pain caused by an opponent's attack back at them. He eventually decides to end the loop after realizing all the trouble he has caused and, with help from his new friends and allies, fights off the pieces of him that protect the Grail and ends the loop for good, but not before using the hidden crack that was opened in space-time of reality in real world made by Rin's copy of the Jeweled Sword of Zelretch by transfer and stabilize the timeline he helped create in the mind of Bazett, thus reviving the participants who died in the real Fifth Holy Grail War more than half a year ago (Masters and Servants, except Kotomine Kirei) and transferring the memories that Avenger did when he acted as Shirou for the true Shirou, so he can live and act on them (except the parts concerning Avenger and his remains as Shades so to hide his existence from Shirou) and so Shirou, Caren, and Bazett can live out whatever life they had made in this new timeline.

He is one of the three main protagonists in the story. Within this installment, Shirou experiences unexpected changes in personality and momentary lapses in memory, particularly related to his own skills. It is later revealed that this is because "Shirou" is connected to Avenger in some mysterious way, causing them to switch places when night falls, implying Avenger is either hiding in Shirō's body or is taking his form during the day, but forgets due to his "non-existence" being overwritten by the earth's laws. Once Shirou/Avenger discovers the truth, he becomes conflicted, as Shirou, with his naive sense of justice, wants to end the loop while Avenger wants to keep living his days out as Shirou, constantly repeating the cycle so that he can experience, by proxy, the life of a normal boy that he never had. When he finally convinces Bazett to finish the word loop, it is revealed that Shirou being possessed by Avenger was nothing more than a replica of Shirou that Avenger created to realize his personal desire, while the real Shirou and his friends were still present in the real world, in Fuyuki, after the events of Fifth Holy Grail War and having passed more than half a year. Once Avenger finally ends the loop and frees Bazett, before completely disappearing Avenger/Grail found the hidden crack that opened with the experiment caused by Rin to use the copy Zelretch's Jeweled Sword which she obtained with the help of Shirou and Illya six months after the Fifth Holy Grail War and using what was left of his power as Grail, Avenger corrected the slot and replaced the original timeline with the one he helped to create in Bazett's mind, thus reviving the Masters and Servants who died or disappeared (in the case of Saber) during the conflict (except Kotomine Kirei) and transferring the memories of all the times when the replicas of Fuyuki people who were present in the world loop made, including the true Shirou, so he and his friends would not be suspicious that the Masters and Servants who died more than half a year were killed really and making them think that they survived the end of Fifth Holy Grail War and living with them all this time, with the only people knowing all occurring being only Bazett, Caren, Illya, and Caster. In epilogue, the true Shirou is tricked into allowing Bazett and Caren stay at the Emiya household.

Saber is portrayed as having become more willing to open up and try and embrace her gender, rather than rejecting it as she did before, and engages in traditionally feminine tasks such as baking and is willing to wear more overtly feminine clothes (i.e. a bikini or a blouse) if it means impressing Shirou, as the lack of combat during the daytime and co-habitation with Rider and Rin has made Saber extremely self-conscious over her lack of femininity. She has also gained a taste for Japanese sweets, venturing out into town on her own to purchase them with the allowance Taiga gives her. She remains fiercely loyal to Shirou/Avenger and several times puts her life on the line (and loses it) to protect him. As she gets more in touch with her gender, Saber also begins to reveal more about her real personality: she is loyal and brave, but is also painfully shy and gets extremely jealous when other girls express interest in her master, such as when Shirou/Avenger has dinner with Sakura. If the player follows her character arc far enough, Saber will eventually confide in Shirou/Avenger that, while she loves living in Japan with him and their friends, she is beginning to feel homesick and wishes to return to England someday if only to visit, hoping that Shirou will come with her. Saber Alter also exists within her, and comes out whenever Saber's stray hair strand is pulled off, though it regenerates with time; Saber Alter is portrayed as the opposite of Saber, as she is blunt, loud, no-nonsense, and enjoys cheap, greasy fast food such as hamburgers.

In the first half of the game, Rin is in London. She returns in the second half with an apparently dramatic change in personality (specifically, a penchant for cosplaying as a miko or magical girls). However, she has also become an experienced mage, demonstrating this when she was the first to logically compose an explanation as to why time has been looping for four days and when she gives Shirou advice. In Fate/hollow ataraxia, she wields the Kaleidostick, another of Zeltretch's inventions which, when activated, transfers knowledge from an alternate version of its user into its current wielder, in addition to providing an ample source of Mana. However, the Kaleidostick dislikes its creator, and frequently manipulates its user into humiliating situations. Her tsundere personality is shown in greater detail here as seen in her interactions. She is shown to be very stingy, bossy and quite mischievous. She makes fun of Shirou several times. She has feelings for Shirou after watching him stubbornly attempting to do a high jump that he had no chance. Although she calls him an idiot, Rin admires Shirou for his tenacity and kind-heart. In Fate/hollow ataraxia, the Kaleidostick is responsible for transforming Rin into the magical girl Kaleido-Ruby. Rin is partially responsible for the current state of affairs in the universe of Fate/stay night. After the Fifth Holy Grail War was finished, she and Shirou's sister, Ilyasviel von Einzbern, were experimenting with creating a copy of the legendary Jeweled Sword of Zelretch and accidentally causing with that any outcome can be drawn in Fuyuki, which meant that at any time, the crack that Rin created by accident and was hidden somewhere in the reality of Fuyuki space-time could be used to alter reality and the timeline in which they were living and could be radically changed from overnight anytime. This is proved in the game's prologue, when the game starts and which is the same time the world loop created by Avenger ended to free Bazett his comatose for more than half a year, the reality that Shirou and his friends knew how finished the Fifth Holy Grail war and all Servants gone with the end of the war was completely changed when Avenger, using his last strength as Grail before disappearing completely, found that crack and corrected by transfer timeline effects that he had helped to create in the mind of Bazett when he was performing the world loop, caused the Fate, Unlimited Blade Works, and Heaven's Feel routes of the original visual novel to converge into a single timeline and then stabilized by seal that crack, resurrecting in the process the Masters and Servants (except Kotomine) who died in that conflict in the real world.

Sakura has developed greatly as a character. Sakura while still retaining her reticent nature throughout the game starts becoming a self confident and self sufficient person both as a magi and as a leader so much so that she even manages to scold Taiga into submission. Sakura has now become the captain of the school's Archery club where which she diligently leads with great skill under the tutelage of Ayako Mitsuzuri. Sakura has become one of the club's top archers to the point that it leads Taiga to believe they could win tournaments. Sakura now stays at the Emiya residence on weekends, holidays and special occasions while becoming the head of the Matou household having ousted Zouken for control. Rider had even said that both Shinji and Zouken are now afraid of her. Sakura continues to assist in cooking having become a sous chef of sorts to Shirou the primary chef of the household and maintaining the upkeep of the Emiya household. Sakura's specialty is apparently pastries beating every other cook in the game in this regard. She and Rin now have a great relationship truly becoming sisters, with Rin educating her in cooking and magecraft despite that Sakura maintains slight resentment and an inferiority complex towards Rin. When it comes to Shirou she still displays jealousy towards other women when Shirou pays them attention over her and continues to pampers and dotes him. Sakura's evil and sadistic side from the Heaven's Feel route of Fate/stay night only comes out every now and then as comic relief in the game.

Since the war, Rider has begun staying at the Emiya household, becoming the de facto adult and breadwinner of the home. She got a job at an antique store to bring some much needed income to the household and mocks Saber as being nothing more than a freeloader, though the two made up after Rider bought her some sweets. She has feelings for Shirou due to him being the first male in her life to treat her with care and respect and once had sex with him while he slept, using an illusion to disguise herself within his dreams and openly admitting that she was open to the idea of a polyamorous relationship between herself, Shirou, and Sakura. She, like Saber, is having trouble adjusting to the modern world and must have basic concepts such as apologizing explained to her at length.

Other characters
While playing less prominent roles, all Masters and Servants of  the fifth Holy Grail War from Fate/stay night appear again, with the exception of Kirei Kotomine, Zouken Matou and True Assassin, as they were never destined to survive the Fifth Holy Grail War (with Kotomine having been cursed with an artificial heart in the Fourth Holy Grail War, and both Zouken Matou and True Assassin only appeared in the Heaven's Feel route).

Adaptations

Manga
There have been many sets of manga anthologies bases on the series produced by different companies and drawn by a multitude of different artists. The first volume of the earliest anthology series was released by Ichijinsha with the title Fate/Hollow Ataraxia Anthology Comic, on January 7, 2006 under their DNA Media Comics imprint; the fifteenth volume in the series was released on August 25, 2008. Two anthology series were then released by Kadokawa, the first was Fate/hollow Ataraxia  ~ Comic la carte, released on January 10, 2006. The second, Fate/hollow ataraxia Comic a la carte ~Happy Life hen~, was released on May 24, 2006. Another two anthology series were then released by Enterbrain. Fate/hollow ataraxia Anthology Comic was released between January 30, 2006 and May 25, 2007 in nine volumes under their Magi-Cu Comics imprint. A 4-koma series was later published by Enterbrain between December 25, 2007 and December 25, 2008 in six volumes.
In 2013, a Fate/hollow ataraxia manga illustrated by Medori and published by Kadokawa began serializing.

Music
A soundtrack to the game, entitled Fate/hollow ataraxia Original Sound Track was published by Geneon Entertainment on November 23, 2005. The single "Hollow" was released by Type-Moon on October 28, 2005.

Reception

Fate/hollow ataraxia became one of the top selling visual novels of 2005. The PS Vita port sold 53,979 copies within the first week of release in Japan, ranking at fourth place amongst all Japanese software sales for that week's sales charts.

Notes

References

External links
Type-Moon official Japanese homepage for Fate/hollow ataraxia''

2005 video games
Bishōjo games
Fate/stay night video games
Eroge
Visual novels
Japan-exclusive video games
Type-Moon
Windows games
PlayStation Vita games
Shōnen manga
Harem video games
Video games about time loops
Video games developed in Japan
Video games related to anime and manga